Te Aupōuri is the second northernmost Māori iwi (tribal group), located north of Kaitaia, Northland, New Zealand, a region known as the Te Hiku o te Ika. The iwi is one of the six Muriwhenua iwi of the far north of the North Island.

Te Reo Irirangi o Te Hiku o Te Ika, an iwi radio station, serves Te Aupōuri and other Muriwhenua tribes of the Far North.

History

The ancestral legend
In Māori, Te Aupouri means "The Dark Smoke" (au = smoke, pōuri = dark). According to legend, the Te Aupōuri came into conflict with Te Rarawa. The battle between the two eventually caused two other chieftains, Te Ikanui and Wheru, to become besieged in their pā in Pawarenga on Whangape Harbour. To mask their escape, they burnt their possessions and escaped under the cover of the smoke.

This is the iwi's chant:

Muriwhenua links
Te Aupōuri are one of the five iwi of Muriwhenua, also known as Te Hiku o te Ika a Māui, the Far North of Aotearoa.

The people of Te Aupōuri share a number of well-known ancestors with wider Muriwhenua including:
 Kupe of the Mata-whao-rua canoe and Te Ngaki of the Tāwhiri-rangi canoe;
 Nukutawhiti of the Ngā-toki-mata-whao-rua canoe;
 Ruanui-a-Tāne of the Māmari canoe and his wife Manawa-a-rangi;
 Whakatau of the Mahuhu-ki-te-rangi canoe;
 Pō-hurihanga of the Kurahaupō canoe and his wife Maieke;
 Tū-moana of the Tinana canoe and his wives Pare-waha-ariki and Kahukura-ariki;
 Te Parata of the Māmaru canoe and his wife Kahu-tia-nui;
 Tōhē and Te Kura-a-rangi;
 Tū-mata-hina and Tangi-rere;
 Rāhiri, Āhua-iti and Whakaruru;
 Ue-oneone and Rei-tū;
 Kai-rewa and Wai-miri-rangi;
 Toa-kai, Tū-kotia and Tara-whati;
 Hāiti-tai-marangai and Puna;
 Tū-whakatere , Tū-te-rangi-a-tohia and Tū-poia; and
 Moko-hōrea and Uru-te-kawa.
From these ancestors descend two families from which Te Aupōuri as an independent iwi trace their descent:
Firstly, the family of Mōre Te Korohunga and Te Awa. The name ‘Te Aupōuri’ came about from an event in the time of Mōre Te Korohunga and Te Awa’s children – Kupe, Whēru, Te Ikanui, Te Kakati and Te Uruhāpainga, and Secondly, the family of Te Ihupango and Te Amongaariki II, who had two daughters – Tihe and Kohine. Te Amongaariki II is especially important to Te Aupōuri being the principal ancestress of the Te Kao lands and the southern Pārengarenga Harbour.

The iwi of Te Aupōuri have their primary turangawaewae at Te Kao at the southern end of the Pārengarenga Harbour, with Te Oneroa-a-Tōhē (Ninety Mile Beach) to the west and Tokerau (Great Exhibition Bay) to the east. Te Aupōuri describe the core area in which they have customary rights and associations, of varying types and nature, as running from Ngāpae in the south-west, east to Ngātū and Waipapakauri Stream, north to the mouth of the Rangaunu Harbour, to Motu-puruhi and Te Rākau-tū-hakahaka (Simmonds Islands) and north to Muri-motu (North Cape), west to Te Rerenga Wairua (Cape Reinga), encompassing Oromaki, Manawa-tāwhi, Moe-kawa and Ohau (Three Kings Islands), south to Motu-o-Pao (Cape Maria van Diemen), to Kahokawa (Scotts Point), Matapia, Waka-te-hāua (The Bluff), Hukatere and back to Ngāpae. Te Aupōuri also maintain historical associations to Rangitāhua (Raoul Island in the Kermadec Islands) and south to Waimimiha.
Other iwi of Te Hiku o Te Ika also claim customary interests in this area.

The people of Te Aupōuri share a number of well known ancestors with the iwi of wider Muriwhenua including: Ruanui-a-Tāne & Manawa-a-rangi; Pō-hurihanga & Maieke; Tū-moana, Pare-waha-ariki & Kahukura-ariki; Te Parata & Kahu-tia-nui; Tōhē & Te Kura-a-rangi; Tū-mata-hina & Tangi-rere; Kai-rewa & Wai-miri-rangi; Toa-kai, Tū-kotia & Tara-whati; Hāiti-tai-marangai & Puna; Tū-whakatere, Tū-te-rangi-a-tohia & Tū-poia and Moko-hōrea & Uru-te-kawa.

From these ancestors descend two families from which Te Aupōuri as an independent iwi trace their descent: firstly the family of Mōre Te Korohunga of Ngāti Ruanui and his wife Te Awa of Muriwhenua, who became known as Ngāti Te Awa (the descendants of Te Awa).
The name ‘Te Aupōuri’ came about from an event in Pawarenga at the time of Mōre Te Korohunga and Te Awa’s children – Kupe, Whēru, Te Ikanui, Te Kakati and Te Uruhāpainga. One day, following the murder of Kupe, and her brother’s revenge, Ngāti Te Awa were besieged in Makora Pā. Finally, Ngāti Te Awa lit a huge fire covering the Whangapē Harbour with thick dark smoke. They managed to escape north across the harbour in the midst of the dense smoke to their mother’s lands further north. Hence the name Te Aupōuri (au = smoke, pōuri = dark).

The second family that Te Aupōuri descend from is that of Te Ihupango and Te Amongaariki II, who had two daughters – Tihe and Kohine. Te Amongaariki II is especially important to Te Aupōuri being the principal ancestress of the Te Kao lands and the southern Pārengarenga Harbour.
Mōre Te Korohunga & Te Awa’s son, Te Ikanui, married Te Ihupango & Te Amongaariki II’s daughters, Tihe & Kohine. These are the ancestors of the Te Aupōuri people of Te Kao – “Ngā Uri O Te Ikanui”.

Ruanui and the Polynesian rats
According to the traditions of the Aotea, Horouta and Māmari ancestral canoes, kiore (Polynesian rats) were passengers on their voyages from Hawaiki to New Zealand. Carvings on a window frame of Te Ōhākī marae at Ahipara depict the story of Ruanui's rat, Ruanui being the captain of the Māmari canoe. On arriving in Hokianga Harbour, he released his rats onto an island now called Motukiore "rat island".

Notable people

 Makarena Dudley, psychologist, lecturer at the University of Auckland and dementia researcher
 Sir Kingi Ihaka, Māori bureaucrat
 Hone Harawira, Mana Party leader
 Raniera Harrison, Māori broadcaster
 Ralph Hotere, artist
 Shane Jones, politician
 Stacey Jones, rugby league player
 Anika Moa, singer
 Tina Cross, singer
 Mitch Evans, racing car driver
 Hinemoa Elder, youth forensic psychiatrist

References

External links
Te Aupōuri's website